This is a timeline of Singaporean history, comprising important legal and territorial changes and political events in Singapore and its predecessor states.  To read about the background to these events, see History of Singapore.  See also the list of years in Singapore.

11th to 12th century

13th century

14th century

15th century

16th century

17th century

19th century

20th century

21st century

References

External links
 Lepoer, Barbara Leitch, ed., Singapore: A Country Study. Washington: GPO for the Library of Congress, 1989.

Singaporean
 
Singapore